"I'll Be Your Light" served as the fourth and final single from Kristine W's third official album, Fly Again. This song also ended her string of consecutive number one Billboard Dance singles when it peaked at number two on the chart dated February 25, 2006.

Chart performance
U.S. Hot Dance Club Play:  #2
U.S. Hot Dance Airplay: #17

Kristine W songs
2006 singles
2003 songs